John Martin O'Keefe (born 1946) is a United States diplomat and a career foreign service officer. He served as the United States Ambassador to Kyrgyzstan 2000–2003.  He graduated from Loyola University Maryland and Harvard University.

References

External links

Ambassadors of the United States to Kyrgyzstan
Living people
1946 births
Loyola University Maryland alumni
Harvard Kennedy School alumni
United States Foreign Service personnel